Asa Werden (1779–1866) was a farmer, businessman and political figure in Upper Canada. He represented Prince Edward in the Legislative Assembly of Upper Canada from 1830 to 1834 as a Conservative.

He was born in Stonington, Connecticut, the son of Dr. Isaac Werden. He married Elizabeth Ellsworth. Werden was involved in the manufacture of leather and the timber trade; he also speculated in land. He served in the militia during the War of 1812. In 1821, he was named a justice of the peace for the Midland District. His election in 1830 was declared invalid but he was reelected in a by-election held the following year. He was an unsuccessful candidate in 1835, losing to Charles Bochus. Werden died in Athol Township, Canada West.

References 
Becoming Prominent: Leadership in Upper Canada, 1791–1841, J.K. Johnson (1989)
Pioneer life on the Bay of Quinte, including genealogies of old families and biographical sketches of representative citizens (1900)  pp. 876–9

1779 births
1866 deaths
Members of the Legislative Assembly of Upper Canada